Helmut Kämpfe (31 July 1909 – 10 June 1944) was a highly decorated Waffen SS Sturmbannführer who was abducted and executed by the French Resistance. In retribution, the Germans carried out the Oradour massacre in occupied France on 10 June 1944. In total 643 men, women and children were killed in Oradour-sur-Glane by troops from the 2nd SS Panzer Division Das Reich. The SS commander who ordered the massacre said the death of Kämpfe was the reason for the killings.

Kämpfe, was a commander in 2nd SS Panzer Division Das Reich." He was a highly decorated soldier, having received both the Close Combat Clasp in Gold and the Knight's Cross of the Iron Cross.

Biography
Kämpfe was born in Thüringen, Germany in 1909. He trained to be a typographer like his father but after Hitler took power in 1933 he became a Leutnant in the Heer before transferring to the Waffen-SS in 1939. On the Eastern Front in Russia, he commanded the 3rd Battalion, 4th SS-Panzergrenadier Der Führer Regiment, the Das Reich Division's reconnaissance group. Kämpfe received the Knights Cross of the Iron Cross for bravery and exemplary leadership during the Zhitomir–Berdichev Offensive in the winter of 1943-44.

In Spring 1944, the Das Reich Division had been withdrawn from Russia and sent to the south of France for refitting in preparation for the anticipated Allied invasion of occupied Europe. While in southern France, Kämpfe was ordered to begin operations against the Maquis (rural guerillas who - according to German intelligence reports - were active in the southern uplands of central France). Canou handed him over to Guingouin. The following day Kämpfe was executed on the orders of Guingouin. According to a French informant Kämpfe was burned alive in front of an audience, but the exact circumstances remain unclear.

When it was discovered that the highly decorated officer had been kidnapped, troops from the Das Reich division and members of the Milice began a brutal search of the surrounding area for Kämpfe. Later that day the massacre at Oradour-sur-Glane was committed by troops from the 1st Battalion, Das Reich.

The commander of the 4th SS Panzer Grenadier Regiment, SS-Standartenführer Sylvester Stadler ordered a court martial into the massacre at Oradour-sur-Glane. SS-Sturmbannführer Adolf Diekmann, the commander of the 1st Battalion, 4th SS Panzer Grenadier Regiment, and a personal friend of Kämpfe, was charged over the killings. He said he found Kämpfe's handcuffed body inside a German field ambulance with the remains of other German soldiers just outside the village of Oradour-sur-Glane. The vehicle had been set alight burning alive everyone inside. After seeing his friend's fate, the village was destroyed on his orders. SS-Brigadeführer Heinz Lammerding, Das Reich's division commander, agreed that Diekmann should face a court martial. All charges were dropped when Diekmann was killed fighting in Normandy on June 29, 1944.

References
Notes

Bibliography

 
 
Penaud, Guy. Oradour-sur-Glane - Un jour de juin 1944 en enfer, Geste éditions, mars 2014, .
 

1909 births
1944 deaths
Military personnel from Jena
SS-Sturmbannführer
Recipients of the Knight's Cross of the Iron Cross
Recipients of the Gold German Cross
People from Saxe-Weimar-Eisenach
Waffen-SS personnel killed in action
Deaths from fire